İsmail Hakkı Bey (1883, Constantinople (Istanbul) - June 4, 1923, Keşan) was a Kurdish officer of the Ottoman Army and later the Turkish Army. He was also a son of Mustafa Zihni Pasha.

Medals and decorations
Order of Osminieh 3rd class with Sword
Ottoman War Medal ("Gallipoli Star", Ottoman Empire)
Silver Medal of Liyakat
Silver Medal of Imtiyaz
Prussia Iron Cross 1st and 2nd class
Austria-Hungary Military Merit Medal (Austria-Hungary) 3rd class 
Medal of Independence with Red Ribbon

See also
List of high-ranking commanders of the Turkish War of Independence
Battle of Sharqat

Sources

1883 births
1923 deaths
Military personnel from Istanbul
Ottoman Military Academy alumni
Ottoman Army officers
Ottoman military personnel of the Italo-Turkish War
Ottoman military personnel of the Balkan Wars
Ottoman military personnel of World War I
Ottoman prisoners of war
World War I prisoners of war held by the United Kingdom
Turkish military personnel of the Turkish War of Independence
Turkish Army officers
Recipients of the Silver Liakat Medal
Recipients of the Silver Imtiyaz Medal
Recipients of the Iron Cross (1914), 1st class
Recipients of the Medal of Independence with Red Ribbon (Turkey)